Carlos Kirmayr (born 23 September 1950) is a retired Brazilian professional tennis player.

Kirmayr won a total of 10 Grand Prix doubles titles.  In singles, he achieved a career-high ranking of World No. 36.

Career finals

Singles 6 (1–5)

Doubles 24 (10–14)

External links
 
 
 

1950 births
Living people
Brazilian people of German descent
Brazilian male tennis players
Tennis players from São Paulo